The Beanies are an Australian children's music group, formed in 2016. The band consists of three theatre performers, Canberra-born Laura Dawson and Miriam "Mim" Rizvi, and Newcastle-born Michael Yore. The group have drawn acclaim and garnered an Australian Podcast Award for their educational podcast of the same name, with their albums garnering two ARIA nominations.

About
The Beanies were formed in Sydney in 2016. As a response to the rising usage of tablets and smartphones amongst young children, the group aimed to produce Australian-made children's entertainment which encourages creativity and imagination without the use of screens. They write and produce all their own material, in collaboration with Sydney-based composer and music producer James Court.  

In October 2018, The Beanies premiered their one-act musical for children, entitled The Beanies' Eggs-traordinary Day, at the Sydney Fringe Festival, which has since been performed at various regional locations throughout NSW. The group performs regularly at fairs, festivals, and community events Australia-wide, including shows at City Recital Hall and the Australia Day Sydney Children's Festival, and their episodes and songs are broadcast internationally. The trio has also been guests on ABC's Weekend Breakfast, Channel 9's Today and Weekend Today, several parenting and productivity podcasts, and at Australian podcast conference OzPod.

In early 2020, The Beanies were signed to the ABC Kids music label, who released their fourth album in April of that year. The group also began live-streaming concerts, due to live shows being postponed during the COVID-19 pandemic, and released a single called Quarantunes during that time. In July of that year, the group also moved their podcast to the Podcast One network, which has since rebranded to LiSTNR.

The group also maintains a YouTube channel, where they release music videos, comic sketches, and concert livestreams.

Members
The Beanies consists of Laura Dawson (Laura Beanie), Miriam Rizvi (Mim Beanie), and Michael Yore (Michael Beanie & Professor Know-It-All). The three also play all of the characters in the podcasts. Singer and drummer Brendan Paul occasionally performs with the group (as understudy Brendan Beanie), as does James Court as keyboardist and 'Music Wizard'. 

For larger concerts, the trio perform with the 'Big Beanie Band' - a live band which consists of a number of Sydney-based session musicians including Court on keyboards, Rachel North on saxophone/clarinet, Michael Napoli on guitar, Amanda Jenkins on bass, and Brendan Paul on drums.

Podcast
With the support of the Mamamia Podcast Network, The Beanies produced ten 15-minute podcast episodes, which were released in April 2017. A second season was confirmed soon after, with sponsorship from Kinderling Kids Radio, and was released in December 2017. Since the third season, released July 2018, the podcast has diversified into multiple separate formats:

 Story Time, including a story, a brief guided meditation (or ‘brain break’), an original song, and an educational segment with 'Professor Know-It-All'.
 Show & Tell, where the trio interact with fans via voice messages and answer their questions.
 Kids News, where the group break down three of the week's top news stories for a young audience.
 Beanies Breakthroughs, standalone mini-episodes focusing on a single topic.

The podcast is currently produced on an ongoing schedule, with a 'Kids News' episode released every Monday, and 'Story Time' and 'Show & Tell' alternating fortnightly on Fridays.

As of January 2022, the podcast consists of over 70 regular 'Story Time' episodes and have amassed in excess of 1.5 million downloads from over 30 different countries. Each episode of The Beanies podcast is written, performed, and edited entirely by The Beanies.

Music
The Beanies' songs and albums are produced independently, and released on the ABC Music label. All tracks have lyrics by Dawson, Rizvi, and Yore, with music composed and produced by James Court. As of October 2022, The Beanies' songs have collectively been streamed over four million times.

Awards and nominations

AIR Awards
The Australian Independent Record Awards (commonly known informally as AIR Awards) is an annual awards night to recognise, promote and celebrate the success of Australia's Independent Music sector.

! 
|-
| 2022
| Let's Go!
| Best Independent Children's Album or EP
|  
|

ARIA Awards

Australian Podcast Awards

MMMA Awards

References

External links
The Beanies official website
The Beanies on Facebook
The Beanies on YouTube
The Beanies on iTunes

Australian children's musical groups
Musical groups established in 2016
Australian podcasters
2016 establishments in Australia